Afsar is a 2018 Indian Punjabi film directed by Gulshan Singh, starring Tarsem Jassar, Nimrat Khaira, Gurpreet Ghuggi and Karamjit Anmol. The film is based on the concept that Kanungo is a higher post than Patwari, but higher respect is given to the Patwari rather than Kanungo. The film is produced by Amiek Virk & Manpreet Johal. it is the debut film for director Gulshan Singh and the debut in a lead role for Nimrat Khaira.

Released theatrically on 5 October 2018, the romantic comedy received good reviews from the public but mixed reviews from critics. Commercially, the film opened well and earned ₹5.72 crore in its opening weekend worldwide.

Synopsis 

Jaspal Singh (Tarsem Jassar), an honest person, is appointed as a Kanungo (a Revenue Inspector, under whom five Patwaris or agricultural land clerks work). Therefore, Kashmiro (Gurpreet Kaur Bhangu), a well wisher and senior lady from his village, wants him to marry her niece, Harman (Nimrat Khaira), who is a teacher in a government school and wants to marry someone in a government job.

Bharpur Singh (Karamjit Anmol), who is a corrupt Patwari (agricultural land clerk) from Harman's village, also has his eye on Harman. When he approaches Harman's drunken and illiterate father regarding his land, he lies and informs him that a Patwari post is higher and richer than that of Kanungo, and therefore the father should have Harman marry Bharpur. So when Jaspal and his family approach Harman's family for her hand, Harman's father refuses them, even though everyone, including Harman, likes Jaspal. As Jaspal is leaving, Harman advises him to work hard and get a post of Patwari so that her father will accept him, to which Jaspal replies that hard work leads to promotion and not demotion, so how can he become a junior official when he is a senior official?

As Jaspal is leaving in his car, another Jaspal Singh (Ravinder Mand), who has recently got the post of Patwari after his father's death, asks him for lift, as his scooter has broken down. On their way, Patwari Jaspal tells Kanungo Jaspal that he doesn't like this government job and prefers lying idle and getting drunk, provided he gets some easy money. Looking at this great opportunity, Kanungo Jaspal gives money to Patwari Jaspal and tells him to go away somewhere and that he will take his place as the new Patwari, as their names are the same and no one knows them in that village.

Kanungo Jaspal makes a fake ID card and, with the document from Patwari, Jaspal reports to Harman's village as the new Patwari, after getting Patwari Bharpur Singh transferred through his best friend's uncle, who is a politician. The film unfolds from there.

Cast 
 Tarsem Jassar as Jaspal Singh
 Nimrat Khaira as Harman
 Gurpreet Ghuggi as Mastar Joga Singh
 Karamjit Anmol as Bharpur Singh Patwari
 Pukhraj Bhalla  as Jaspal's friend
 Prince Kanwaljit Singh
 Nirmal Rishi  
 Parkash Gadhu as Shopkeeper
 Rana Jung Bahadur as Jaila
 Vijay Tandon as Shopkeeper
 Gurnam Bhullar as guest appearance
 Himanshi Khurana as guest appearance

Soundtrack 

The soundtrack of Afsar was composed by Jaidev Kumar, Preet Hundal and R Guru, whereas the background score was composed by Gurcharan Singh. Afsar features the vocals from Tarsem Jassar, Nimrat Khaira, Arjan Dhillon and Ranjit Bawa, whereas lyrics were written by Tarsem Jassar, Arjan Dhillon, Harmanjeet and Gurbinder Mann. Music rights of the film were sold to White Hill Studios.

Track List

Reception 

Afsar had grossed ₹2.17 crore in Canada and ₹39.65 lacs in United States.

References

External links 
 

Punjabi-language Indian films
2018 directorial debut films
2018 films
2010s Punjabi-language films